The following lists events that happened during 1815 in Chile.

Incumbents
Royal Governor of Chile: Mariano Osorio (-26 December), Francisco Marcó del Pont (26 December)

Events

Births
20 May - Agustín Edwards Ossandón (d. 1878)

Deaths

References 

 
Chile
Chile